The Hutsulka is a popular Ukrainian folk dance from southwestern Ukraine. It is performed by amateurs, professional Ukrainian dance ensembles and other performers of folk dances.

The Hutsulka or Verkhovynka are musical relatives of the kolomiyka, with a difference.

This dance is performed at every Hutsul wedding to this day. Parents teach even very young children how to dance to keep old traditions going, because it's a huge part of Hutsul culture.

Hutsuls
Ukrainian dances